11th Online Film Critics Society Awards
January 8, 2008

Best Picture:
No Country for Old Men
The 11th Online Film Critics Society Awards, honoring the best in film for 2007, were given on 9 January 2008.

Winners and nominees

Best Picture
No Country for Old Men
Atonement
Juno
There Will Be Blood
Zodiac

Best Director
Joel & Ethan Coen – No Country for Old Men
Paul Thomas Anderson – There Will Be Blood
David Cronenberg – Eastern Promises
David Fincher – Zodiac
Julian Schnabel – The Diving Bell and the Butterfly

Best Actor
Daniel Day-Lewis – There Will Be Blood
George Clooney – Michael Clayton
Emile Hirsch – Into the Wild
Frank Langella – Starting Out in the Evening
Viggo Mortensen – Eastern Promises

Best Actress
Julie Christie – Away from Her
Marion Cotillard – La Vie en Rose
Angelina Jolie – A Mighty Heart
Laura Linney – The Savages
Elliot Page – Juno

Best Supporting Actor
Javier Bardem – No Country for Old Men
Casey Affleck – The Assassination of Jesse James by the Coward Robert Ford
Philip Seymour Hoffman – Charlie Wilson's War
Hal Holbrook – Into the Wild
Tom Wilkinson – Michael Clayton

Best Supporting Actress
Amy Ryan – Gone Baby Gone
Cate Blanchett – I'm Not There
Jennifer Garner – Juno
Kelly Macdonald – No Country for Old Men
Saoirse Ronan – Atonement
Tilda Swinton – Michael Clayton

Best Original Screenplay
Juno – Diablo CodyBefore the Devil Knows You're Dead – Kelly Masterson
Eastern Promises – Steven Knight
Michael Clayton – Tony Gilroy
Ratatouille – Brad Bird

Best Adapted ScreenplayNo Country for Old Men – Joel & Ethan CoenAtonement – Christopher Hampton
The Diving Bell and the Butterfly – Ronald Harwood
There Will Be Blood – Paul Thomas Anderson
Zodiac – James Vanderbilt

Best Foreign Language FilmThe Diving Bell and the ButterflyThe HostThe Lives of OthersThe OrphanageLa Vie en RoseBest DocumentaryThe King of Kong: A Fistful of QuartersIn the Shadow of the Moon
Into Great Silence
No End in Sight
Sicko

Best Animated FeatureRatatouilleBeowulf
Paprika
Persepolis
The Simpsons Movie

Best CinematographyNo Country for Old Men – Roger DeakinsThe Assassination of Jesse James by the Coward Robert Ford – Roger Deakins
Atonement – Seamus McGarvey
The Diving Bell and the Butterfly – Janusz Kamiński
There Will Be Blood – Robert Elswit

Best EditingNo Country for Old Men – Joel & Ethan CoenAtonement – Paul Tothill
The Bourne Ultimatum – Christopher Rouse
There Will Be Blood – Dylan Tichenor
Zodiac – Angus Wall

Best Original ScoreThere Will Be Blood – Jonny GreenwoodThe Assassination of Jesse James by the Coward Robert Ford – Nick Cave and Warren Ellis
Atonement – Dario Marianelli
Into the Wild – Michael Brook, Kaki King, and Eddie Vedder
Once – Glen Hansard and Markéta Irglová

Breakthrough FilmmakerSarah Polley – Away from HerBen Affleck – Gone Baby Gone
Juan Antonio Bayona – The Orphanage
John Carney – Once
Tony Gilroy – Michael Clayton

Breakthrough PerformerNikki Blonsky – Hairspray'Glen Hansard – OnceSam Riley – ControlTang Wei – Lust, CautionCarice van Houten – Black Book''

References

2007
2007 film awards